The Amalgamated Banks of South Africa Tower (simply Absa Tower or ABSA Tower) is an office skyscraper in the Central Business District of Johannesburg, South Africa. It is 31 storeys tall. It is also the headquarters of Absa Group Limited.

References

Amethyst: Johannesburg Landmarks. Retrieved 11 February 2008.

Skyscraper office buildings in Johannesburg
Office buildings completed in 1970
20th-century architecture in South Africa